Charles Strong was lynched by in Mayo, Florida. According to the United States Senate Committee on the Judiciary it was the 5th of 61 lynchings during 1922 in the United States.

Background
Mailman W.R. Taylor was the son of a well-known naval stores operator in Mayo, Florida. On Saturday, January 14, 1922, he entered the home of Charles Strong to investigate a dispute. In this home, around midnight, he was shot and killed by a shotgun. Charles Strong, accused of firing the gun, claimed that another man held the shotgun but he fled anyway and was on the run for three days before he was arrested by police.

Lynching

The police were taking Strong to jail when they were met by a white mob of 1,000 people. They seized Strong, hung him from a tree, and riddled his hanging corpse with bullets.

Bibliography 
Notes

References 

1922 riots
1922 in Florida
African-American history of Florida
Lynching deaths in Florida 
February 1922 events
Protest-related deaths
Racially motivated violence against African Americans 
Riots and civil disorder in Florida 
White American riots in the United States